The Sun Odyssey 45.2 is a French sailboat that was designed by Philippe Briand and the Jeanneau Design Office as a cruiser and first built in 1997.

The boat was also sold as the Moorings 45.2 to Moorings Yacht Charter and as the Stardust 453 three-cabin boat and Stardust 454 four-cabin boat for the general yacht charter market.

Production
The design was built by Jeanneau in France, 1997 until 2003, but it is now out of production.

Design
The Sun Odyssey 45.2 is a recreational keelboat, built predominantly of fiberglass, with wood trim. It has a masthead sloop rig, a raked stem plumb stem, a reverse transom with step and a swimming platform, an internally mounted spade-type rudder controlled by a wheel and a fixed fin keel with a weighted bulb, or an optional deep-draft keel. The fin keel model displaces  and carries  of ballast, while the deep draft keel version displaces  and carries  of ballast.

A smaller  water capacity was a factory option.

The design was produced in versions with three or four cabins, with sleeping accommodation for six to eight people. The three cabin version has a double berth in the bow cabin, a "U"-shaped settee and a straight settee on the starboard side of the main cabin and two aft cabins with a double berth in each. The galley is located on the port side amidships. The galley has a straight configuration and is equipped with a four-burner stove, an ice box and a double sink. A navigation station is opposite the galley, on the starboard side. There are two heads, one just aft of the bow cabin on the starboard side and one on the port side, aft. The four cabin version divides the large bow cabin into two smaller cabins, each with a double berth.

Operational history
In a 2015 review for RightBoat, Samantha Wilson wrote, "the Jeanneau Sun Odyssey 45.2 is a luxury cruising sailboat that represents a balance between performance, comfort, and elegance. It has fine entry lines, a responsive and quick hull, and an unencumbered deck layout, together with luxurious 3-cabin accommodation below deck. Teak joinery is blended with white fabric liners to create a bright feeling. A second-hand Jeanneau Sun Odyssey 45.2 is a yacht that comes with a well-deserved reputation as a fast luxurious passage-maker."

See also
List of sailing boat types

References

External links

Keelboats
1990s sailboat type designs
Sailing yachts
Sailboat type designs by Philippe Briand
Sailboat type designs by Jeanneau Design Office
Sailboat types built by Jeanneau